The following radio stations broadcast on AM frequency 1440 kHz: 1440 AM is a regional broadcast frequency.

Argentina
 LRI221 in Reconquista, Santa Fe.
 LV20 in Laboulaye, Cordoba.
 LU36 in Coronel Suarez, Buenos Aires.
 LRA53 in San Martin de los Andes, Neuquen.
 Impacto in La Matanza, Buenos Aires.

Canada
 CKJR in Wetaskiwin, Alberta - 10 kW, transmitter located at

China 
 CNR The Voice of China in Putian

Denmark
 Radio 208 in Ishøj, Copenhagen - 500 W transmitter located at

Japan
 JOWF in Sapporo

Luxembourg
RTL Radio. RTL also sells airtime to Radio China International and some religious broadcasters. This station closed on 31 December 2015.

Mexico
 XEEST-AM in Mexico City

Taiwan 
 Transfers CNR The Voice of China in Kinmen

United States

References

Lists of radio stations by frequency